The King Abdullah Bin Abdulaziz Arabic Health Encyclopedia (KAAHE) is an Arabic public health encyclopedia. It was created in May 2010 by the King Saud bin Abdulaziz University for Health Sciences (KSAU-HS) in collaboration with the Saudi Association for Health Informatics (SAHI). Medical content was added by the World Health Organization (WHO), the Health On the Net Foundation (HON) and the National Guard Health Affairs (NGHA).

According to a paper published in BMC Health Services Research, the Arabic content of KAAHE is easy to understand for both experts and consumers. Although, some sections of the encyclopedia can be improved.

See also 
Arabic encyclopedia

References

External links
  

2010 establishments in Saudi Arabia
Arabic-language encyclopedias
Arabic-language websites
Scientific organisations based in Saudi Arabia
Multilingual websites
Saudi Arabian online encyclopedias